Garra menderesensis is a species of ray-finned fish in the genus Garra, endemic to Lake Işıklı and the Büyük Menderes River in Turkey.

References 

Garra
Fish described in 2015